Calisto zangis, the Jamaican satyr is a butterfly of the family Nymphalidae. It is endemic to Jamaica and the Guianas.

References

Butterflies described in 1775
Calisto (butterfly)
Taxa named by Johan Christian Fabricius